Badminton Canada is the national governing body for the sport of badminton in Canada. The association is composed of 13 
member associations representing all of the provinces and territories of Canada.

History
The association was founded as Canadian Badminton Association in 1921 by representatives from badminton clubs across Canada. The next year, the first ever national championships was held in Montreal. It changed its name to Badminton Canada in 1989.

Tournaments
 Canada Open, an open tournament part of BWF Tour Super 100.
 Canadian International, discontinued since 2013.
 Canadian National Badminton Championships

Hall of Fame

Builders
Bert Fergus 
Dorothy Tinline
Jack MacDonald
Wayne Macdonnell
Jim Powell
David Waddell

Coaches
John Gilbert
Channarong Ratanaseangsuang
Abdul Shaikh

Officials
Jim Lynch
Jean-Guy Poitras

Players
Claire Backhouse-Sharpe
Mike Butler
Denyse Julien
Wayne Macdonnell
Jamie Paulson
Jack Underhill

See also
 Canada national badminton team

References

National members of the Badminton World Federation
Badminton in Canada
Badminton
1921 establishments in Canada